Adrienne Germain (1947-May 19, 2022) was a women's health advocate and activist. She was the second president of the International Women's Health Coalition (IWHC). Germain was also a researcher and author.

Biography 
Germain earned a bachelor's degree from Wellesley College in 1969 and had a master's degree in sociology and demography from the University of California, Berkeley. Germain was the first woman to act as a representative of "any donor agency" in Bangladesh. Germain worked for the Ford Foundation for 14 years before she started working at the  International Women's Health Coalition (IWHC). She was appointed vice president of IWHC in 1985. Germain worked as a strategist and adviser to the United States delegation at the International Conference on Population and Development in Cairo. Germain feels that it is essential for women's rights that women have the freedom to control their own bodies and full access to educational opportunities. She says, "If they are forced to have sex, denied information and protection about sexual diseases, it limits how they can be and act in the world."

Germain received the United Nations Population Award in June 2012 in recognition of her work in the field. Germain committed suicide on May 19, 2022.

Selected works

References

External links 
 Oral history transcript (2003)
 Interview (video)
 Why Women Take the Streets (video)

1947 births
Living people
Wellesley College alumni
University of California, Berkeley alumni
American feminists